Sir George William Robert Campbell  (1835–1905) was the first British colonial Inspector General of Police of British Ceylon.

Campbell was born in 1835 in Campbeltown, Argyll, Scotland, the son of John Campbell and Eliza née Elder. He enlisted in the Argyll and Bute Militia and served in India, where he was appointed assistant superintendent in the revenue survey. During the Indian Rebellion of 1857 he was adjutant of the Ahmedabad Koli Corps, Assistant-Superintendent of Police and Assistant Magistrate. After serving as chief of police in the Indian province of Ratnagiri, he was appointed by Governor Frederick North on 3 September 1866, as Chief Superintendent of Police in Ceylon, in charge of the Police Force. Therefore, 3 September 1866 is considered as the beginning of Sri Lanka Police Service. The post was changed to Inspector General of Police in 1867. In 1872 he was appointed Acting Lieutenant-Governor of Penang, Malaysia, a position he served for one year before returning to his role as Inspector General of Police. In 1887 he was awarded the CMG. In 1891 he retired and returned to England, where he received a knighthood for his service. Campbell died on 10 January 1905.

References

Further reading
"Sir William Campbell"  The Police Journal: A Review for the Police Forces of the British Commonwealth of Nations  Vol. XXXIX No. 1 (January 1966): 328.

British colonial police officers
Sri Lankan Inspectors General of Police
British police officers in India
People from British Ceylon
Sri Lankan people of British descent
1905 deaths
1835 births
Knights Commander of the Order of St Michael and St George
Administrators in British Penang
British people of the Indian Rebellion of 1857